Waikaremoana Waitoki, also known as Moana Waitoki, is a New Zealand clinical psychologist, academic, and former president of the New Zealand Psychological Society from 2020 until 2022. She is a senior lecturer at the University of Waikato, and focuses her research on indigenous psychology,  and cultural competency.

Biography

Waitoki graduated from the University of Waikato with a Postgraduate Diploma in Clinical Psychology, becoming a member of the New Zealand Psychological Society's National Standing Committee on Bicultural Issues in 1998.

From 2002 until 2009, Waitoki was a board member of the New Zealand Psychologists Board. Waitoki was one of the driving forces of the National Māori Graduates of Psychology Symposium, an event held in November 2002. In the early 2010s, Waitoki was the Bicultural Director of the New Zealand Psychological Society.

In 2016, Waitoki published a book entitled : Indigenous psychology in /New Zealand, a compilation of 18 Māori psychologists' opinions on a single case study.

Since 2018, Waitoki has been an investigator in several large-scale projects. In 2018, she became the lead investigator for a Marsden grant-funded study involving  and Indigenous psychology, and in the following year received an additional Marsden grant, as a member of a multidisciplinary team researching Waikato wetland pā using carbon–14 wiggle-match dating (WMD) and dendrochronology to give more precise dates to wetland pā pallisades. In 2019, Waitoki proposed the creation of a Kaupapa Māori-based clinical psychology programme in New Zealand, training Māori clinicians with a Māori world view, in order to address inequalities in the New Zealand mental health system.

Waitoki received two grants from the Ministry of Business, Innovation and Employment in 2020. The second, Working to End Racial Oppression (WERO), is a project examining the impacts of racism, leading towards the development of tools to measure and combat institutional racism.

In 2020, Waitoki became the president of the New Zealand Psychological Society. In the following year, she became a fellow of the New Zealand Psychological Society. Waitoki also works as an advisory member of the Suicide Prevention Office of the Ministry of Health, and as a member of the Film and Literature Classification Board.

In November 2022 Waitoki was awarded the Te Puāwaitanga Research Excellence Award for eminent and distinctive contribution to Te Ao Māori and indigenous knowledge by the Royal Society Te Apārangi, for her work "indigenising the psychology profession".

Personal life

Waitoki is ranked 3rd dan in Kyokushin karate. As an instructor, Waitoki uses Māori language during karate lessons. Waitoki raised her children and grandchildren to speak te Reo Māori.

Bibliography

Selected works

References

Living people
New Zealand female karateka
New Zealand Māori women academics
New Zealand psychologists
New Zealand women academics
New Zealand women psychologists
Ngāti Hako people
Ngāti Māhanga people
Psychology educators
Racism researchers
Recipients of Marsden grants
Academic staff of the University of Waikato
Place of birth missing (living people)
Date of birth missing (living people)
Year of birth missing (living people)